Trotsenko is a surname. Notable people with the surname include: 

Roman Trotsenko (born 1970), Russian billionaire businessman
Yefim Trotsenko (1901–1972), Soviet military leader